Charles Towne Landing State Historic Site in the West Ashley area of Charleston, South Carolina preserves the original site of the first permanent English settlement in Carolina. Originally opened in 1970 to commemorate South Carolina's tricentennial, this  site is home to an exhibit hall, rental facility, a natural habitat zoo, ongoing archeological excavations, miles of trails, dozens of picnic tables, a replica tall ship, six fireable replica cannon, and much more.

Living history

Experimental Crop Garden
The Experimental Crop Garden showcases crops planted by early colonists for food and profit. While offerings vary seasonally, sugarcane and indigo, two attempted cash crops, are frequently visible.

Adventure

Adventure is a replica of a ketch, a popular style of 17th-century cargo vessel. Similar ships carried commercial goods, foodstuffs, and even livestock between New York, Barbados, and everywhere in between. Renowned 20th century naval architect and historian William Avery Baker designed Adventure in 1969. The first Adventure served Charles Towne Landing from 1970 until 2004. The second Adventure was constructed in 2008 by Rockport Marine in Maine and sailed to Charles Towne Landing in October, 2008.

Fortified area
The Fortified Area of the site is bounded by a reconstructed palisade wall. Colonists constructed the original palisade wall to defend the young colony from a land-side attack from the Spanish, or their native allies. The Fortified Area also contains reconstructed earthwork fortifications and six replica cannon. The colonists mounted a battery of cannon facing the Ashley River, and a second battery defended Towne Creek (present day Old Towne Creek). Both the palisade wall and earthwork fortifications are both partially reconstructed on their archeological footprint.

Animal forest
The Animal Forest, a natural habitat zoo, is home to species indigenous to Carolina in the 1670s. Some of these animals, such as puma and bison, are no longer native to the South Carolina Low Country.  Animals at the zoo include:

Birds
Great blue heron (Ardea herodias)
Brown pelican (Pelecanus occidentalis)
Great egret (Casmerodius albus)
Black-crowned night heron (Nycticorax nycticorax)
White ibis (Eudocimus albus)
Wild turkey (Maleagris gallopavo)
Turkey vulture (Cathartes aura)
Black vulture (Coragyps atratus)
Yellow-crowned night heron (Nyctanassa violacea)

Mammals

Red wolf (Canis rufus)
Striped skunk (Mephitis mephitis)
Black bear (Ursus americanus)
White-tailed deer (Odocoileus virginianus)
Bison (Bison bison)
Bobcat (Felis rufus)
Pumas/cougars/mountain lions (Felis concolor)
North American river otter (Lutra canadensis)

Archaeology
Archaeological finds include Native American, English, and African artifacts. Professional archeology at the site began in 1967, and continues through the present day.

References

Sources
 “Charles Towne Landing.” By the Numbers.
 “Charles Towne Landing State Historic Site.” About This Park – Charles Towne Landing State Historic Site. 28 Oct. 2009.
 “Living History” Charles Towne Landing South Carolina Historical Park – Attractions – Living History. 15 Oct. 2009

External links

Friends of Charles Towne Landing

Parks in Charleston, South Carolina
National Register of Historic Places in Charleston, South Carolina
Museums in Charleston, South Carolina
South Carolina state historic sites
Zoos in South Carolina
History museums in South Carolina
Archaeological sites in South Carolina
Living museums in South Carolina